Mandakini (The Milky Way) is a 1999 Sri Lankan Sinhala drama film directed by H.D. Premaratne and executive production by Kithsiri Karunarathna. It stars Ravindra Randeniya and Sabeetha Perera in lead roles along with Asoka Peiris and W. Jayasiri. Music composed by Rohana Weerasinghe. It is the 925th Sri Lankan film in the Sinhala cinema.

Production
Film was co-produced by director himself with a group of young Sri Lankans in Australia including Kithsiri Karunarathna, Wimal Samarasingha, Ujith Hewabasithage, Athula Ginige, Kamal Bandara, S.J. Sarath Kumara, Srilal Jayaweera and Lakshman Gamage. The world premiere was held in Sydney under the patronage of Australians and aborigines at Greater Union Theatre in 7 March 1999. It is the first Sri Lanka-Australia co-production. Two professional aborigine actors, Joe Horacek and Chris Johnson starring in the film as well as Veddhas in Sri Lanka.

The film has been shot in and around Sydney, Opera House and the Harbour, Australia and locations of Blue Mountain in Katumba, Javis Bay and Redfern two prominent aborigines villages. Professor Sunil Ariyaratne and Vasantha Kumara Kobawaka worked as lyricists whereas Samitha Mudunkotuwa, Athula Adhikari and Athma Liyanage joined as playback singers. Wimal Samaranayake is the production manager while Lal Harindranath is the art director.

Plot

Cast
 Ravindra Randeniya
 Sabeetha Perera
 Asoka Peiris
 W. Jayasiri
 Pradeep Senanayake
 Janaka Kumbukage
 Damitha Abeyratne 
 Mahendra Perera
 Gnananga Gunawardana
 Sherani Wijesena
 Joe Horacek 
 Chris Johnson
 Uruwarige Wannila Aththo
 Dambane Gunawardhana

References

External links
 
 Gajaman on YouTube

2007 films
2000s Sinhala-language films